A varicocele is an abnormal enlargement of the pampiniform venous plexus in the scrotum. This plexus of veins drains blood from the testicles back to the heart. The vessels originate in the abdomen and course down through the inguinal canal as part of the spermatic cord on their way to the testis. Varicoceles occur in around 15% to 20% of all men. The incidence of varicocele increase with age.

Signs and symptoms
Varicocele might be noticed as soft lumps, usually above the testicle and mostly on the left side of the scrotum. Right-sided and bilateral varicocele does also occur. Men with varicocele can feel symptoms of pain or heaviness in their scrotum. Large varicoceles present as plexus of veins and may be described as a "bag of worms". Varicocele is sometimes discovered when investigating the cause of male infertility.

Cause

There are three main theories as to the anatomical cause; the first has to do with the geometry of the veins, wherein the vein on the left side connects to the larger outflowing vein at a right angle, which tends to fail; the second is that valves that are supposed to prevent backflow fail (venous insufficiency); the third is due to excessive pressure in upstream arteries, created by nutcracker syndrome.

Pathophysiology
Often the greatest concern with respect to varicocele is its effect on male fertility. The relationship between varicocele and infertility is unclear. Some men with the condition are fertile, some have sperm that are normal in shape and move normally but are compromised in function, and some have sperm with abnormal shapes or that do not move well. Theories as to how varicocele affects sperm function include damage via excess heat caused by the blood pooling and oxidative stress on sperm.

Tobacco smoking and mutations in the gene expressing glutathione S-transferase Mu 1 both put men at risk for infertility; these factors may also exacerbate the risk that varicocele will affect fertility.

Diagnosis
Following discovery of the sign of swelling comprising a mass, varicocele can be confirmed with scrotal ultrasound, which will show dilation of the vessels of the pampiniform plexus to be greater than 2 mm.

Imaging
Manual examination of scrotum is required for proper interpretation of ultrasound images. During ultrasound examination, diameters of veins in pampiniform plexus are measured and regurgitation is measured. The subject is then instructed to stand up and Valsalva maneuver is performed. The diameter is then measured and changes in blood flow direction is recorded to assess any regurgitation.

Treatment

The two most common surgical approaches are retroperitoneal (abdominal using laparoscopic surgery), infrainguinal/subinguinal (below the groin) and inguinal (groin using percutaneous embolization). Possible complications of this procedure include hematoma (bleeding into tissues), hydrocele (accumulation of fluid around the affected testicle), infection, or injury to the scrotal tissue or structures. In addition, injury to the artery that supplies the testicle may occur, resulting in a loss of a testicle.

Prognosis 
Whether having varicocele surgery or embolization improves male fertility is controversial, as good clinical data is lacking.  There is tentative evidence that varicocelectomy may improve fertility in those with obvious findings and abnormal sperm; however, this has a number needed to treat of 7 for varicocelectomy and 17 for embolization. There are also studies showing that the regular surgery has no significant effect on infertility.  A 2012 Cochrane review (updated in 2021) found tentative but unclear evidence of improved fertility among males treated for varicocele. Evidence for sclerotherapy is unclear as of 2015.

Epidemiology
Around 15% to 20% of all adult males, up to 35% to 40% of men who are evaluated for male infertility, and around 80% of men who are infertile due to some other cause, have varicocele.

References

Andrology
Male genital disorders
Scrotum
Vascular diseases